The Squash at the 2006 Commonwealth Games was played for the most part at the Melbourne Sports and Aquatic Centre. Singles play took place from March 16 to 20 (Men's and Women's), and the doubles was contested from March 21 to 26 (Men's, Women's, and Mixed).

A high number of multiple entries by countries in the doubles events occurred because players could enter both the men's or women's events as well as the mixed doubles, and countries could put in as many entries as they chose to, as long as their players were in one of the singles events. The most medals one player could win at the Games was three: one in singles, one in men's or women's doubles, and one in mixed. Australians David Palmer, Rachael Grinham and Natalie Grinham all achieved this feat, with Natalie Grinham winning three gold medals. She was the first competitor ever to win three gold medals in squash at a single Commonwealth Games.

Medals Table

Medallists

Results

Men's singles (16-20 March)

Women's singles (16-20 March)

Men's doubles (21-26 March)

Women's doubles (21-26 March)

Mixed doubles (21-26 March)

References

2006 Commonwealth Games events
Commonwealth Games
2006
Squash tournaments in Australia